Shivam is a 2015 Indian Telugu-language romantic action comedy film directed by Sreenivasa Reddy and produced by Sravanthi Ravi Kishore. The film is produced under Sri Sravanthi Movies banner. The film stars Ram Pothineni and Raashi Khanna.

Plot
Shiva  is a young and happy-go-lucky guy who supports love marriage and keeps helping couples to get married against their parents will. On one fine day, when he is in a train, he sees Tanu  proposing to him loudly from the nearby field. Actually, Tanu was performing an act for her audition. Tanu's friend Rishitha  told her acting was good, but asked to whom she proposed during the act. Misunderstood, Shiva jumps out from the train and starts approaching to Tanu, although she runs away. Shiva finally follows Tanu in a school. Tanu was doing a rehearsal for her acting in theatre. He thought that Tanu fell in love with him. But she continuously rejects him. He makes his friend Rishi's marriage with her lover and asks Tanu to turn back if she loves him, or he would never come into her life.

But Bhoji Reddy's men come to beat him because he had beaten up his son. He says that if she turns back, he would beat them up; if she doesn't, he would come with them. Eventually, Abhi, who was looking for Shiva, takes Tanu with him. Shiva beats them up after a man says that she turned back. Abhi reveals that Tanu was always lucky for him and wants to marry her. Shiva takes her away at her wedding, leaving a fight between Abhi and Bhoji. They both unite and search for Shiva. Tanu and Shiva go to Goa. In that time, Tanu falls for him. When she is about to propose to him, he fights with some goons to make two lovers unite. As he is seriously wounded, she asks him either she or they. Shiva eventually supports them, which makes her emotional. Bhoji kidnaps her. Shiva's father reveals that his son's real name is Ram. Ram and Shiva were best friends, until Shiva committed suicide. Ram learns that he loved a girl who also committed suicide. He hid this because Ram would risk his life to get them married. After hearing this, Tanu realizes her mistake, Bhoji too gives up, and Abhi goes through memory loss. As the film ends on a happy note, Tanu meets Shiva/Ram at a mall, proposes to him, which Ram/Shiva accepts, and they live happily together.

Cast

Ram Pothineni as Shiva / Ram
Raashi Khanna as Tanu
Abhimanyu Singh as Abhi
Brahmanandam as Tiger Bhai
Vineet Kumar as Bhoji Reddy
Jaya Prakash Reddy as Bhoji Reddy's brother-in-law
Posani Krishna Murali as Shiva's father
Mano as Tanu's father 
Srinivasa Reddy as Ramakrishna, Shiva's friend
Satyam Rajesh as Shiva's friend
Himaja as Rishitha, Tanu's friend
Nagineedu as Krishna Murthy
Krishna Bhagavan as IPod Shastry 
Shafi as Mustafa
Saptagiri as Happy
Fish Venkat as Fish
Pankaj Kesari as Peddi Reddy
Naresh
Amit Tiwari
Madhunandan as Balkrishna "Balki"
Surekha Vani
Appaji Ambarisha Darbha as Inspector general of police

Music

Devi Sri Prasad has scored the music for the soundtrack. The audio launched on 12 September 2015 and Aditya Music purchased the audio rights. All Lyrics were penned by Bhaskarabhatla Ravi Kumar.

Reception 
The film received mixed to negative reviews from critics. Pranita Jonnalagedda of The Times of India gave the film a rating of 2.5/5 and wrote "The only saving grace in this film are the songs which picturised very well. All in all the film is extremely lengthy, too ordinary and very boring". Suresh Kavirayani of Deccan Chronicle gave the film a rating of 2.5/5 and wrote "The songs, some of which have been shot exceptionally well in lovely locations, provide relief in an otherwise ordinary film". Sangeetha Devi Dundoo of The Hindu stated "The film is lengthy, boring and comedy isn’t enough to save the day".

References

External links
 

2015 films
2010s Telugu-language films
2015 action comedy films
Indian romantic comedy films
Films shot in Ooty
Indian action comedy films
2015 romantic comedy films
2015 masala films
Indian romantic action films
2010s romantic action films